Paul Sarossy,  (born April 24, 1963) is a Canadian cinematographer and film director. He is known for his collaborations with director Atom Egoyan, serving as his director of photography on twelve feature films (Speaking Parts, The Adjuster, Exotica, The Sweet Hereafter, Felicia's Journey, Ararat, Where the Truth Lies, Adoration, Chloe, Devil's Knot, The Captive & Remember).

He has won five Genie Awards for Best Achievement in Cinematography, a Gemini Award, and five Canadian Society of Cinematographers awards, as well as being nominated for a Primetime Emmy Award and an Independent Spirit Award. He made his directorial debut with the British crime drama Mr In-Between, which premiered at the Toronto International Film Festival in 2001, and received a British general release in 2003.

Sarossy is married to the Northern Irish actress Geraldine O'Rawe. He is the son of Hungarian-born cinematographer Ivan Sarossy. He is a member of the Canadian, British, and American Society of Cinematographers. He has cited the work of cinematographers Vittorio Storaro, Sven Nykvist, and Néstor Almendros and director Bernardo Bertolucci as an overarching influence on his oeuvre.

Filmography

Film

Television

Awards and nominations 

2022
Canadian Society of Cinematographers
Best Cinematography in 1/2 hour television
"Guilty Party"
(won)

References

External links
 Paul Sarossy's Home Page - DEAD LINK
 Paul Sarossy - KM Reps

1963 births
Living people
Best Cinematography Genie and Canadian Screen Award winners
Canadian cinematographers
Canadian people of Hungarian descent
Film directors from Ontario
People from Barrie
York University alumni